E.S.P. is the seventeenth studio album (fifteenth worldwide) by the British group the Bee Gees. Released in 1987, it was the band's first studio album in six years, and their first release under their new contract with Warner Bros. It marked the first time in twelve years the band had worked with producer Arif Mardin, and was their first album to be recorded digitally.

The album's first single, "You Win Again", reached  in the UK, Ireland, Switzerland, Germany, Austria and Norway.

The album cover photographs show the Gibb brothers at Castlerigg stone circle near Keswick in England's Lake District.

History
With the Bee Gees now back in the Warner-Elektra-Atlantic conglomerate, producer Arif Mardin was once again available to work with them.

The Gibb brothers began writing and recording songs for E.S.P. around September 1986. They worked at Maurice's home studio, informally known as Panther House, rather than at Middle Ear. Maurice set everything up and Scott Glasel was effectively the assistant engineer. Scott's recollection years later is that Barry brought in the songs as demos, featuring just his voice and guitar, and that they recorded the fuller demos based on Barry's songs. Scott also recalls Barry and Robin many times arguing heatedly over trivial things and calling off the project, only to have Maurice call Scott a few days later to let him know they were starting again.

Recording
Over the previous few years Barry and Robin had become accustomed to different recording styles. Barry preferred to write the songs and record demos, then go into the studio with session players to record polished versions for release. Robin instead liked to use the recording sessions themselves to work out the songs. Maurice liked a hands-on approach and where he had a voice in production he either appears prominently on the finished tracks or worked out arrangements with a few session players during recording. The compromise recording method adopted for E.S.P. was for the brothers to start all the recordings themselves and then complete them with session players and a producer. If they started with an idea and a rhythm track, they built a song onto it as they recorded, something that would accommodate what all three preferred to do. The result of this process would then be a demo, with vocals by the three brothers and instrumentals by Maurice and Barry. The album made extensive use of the Fairlight CMI as much of the drumming was programmed using the instrument by Barry and Maurice and their engineer Scott Glasel. The Gibb instrumental tracks were done from October into 1987. The second stage appears to have been recording the main vocal tracks, and where this was done is unknown. The demo of "E.S.P." on the box set Tales from the Brothers Gibb is at this second stage. Lastly, session musicians replaced most of the instrumental parts and the brothers dubbed additional vocals. They also edited some of the tracks, inserted new sections, and sped up at least two of them. A song titled "Young Love" was scrapped from the album, and was the only outtake.

Track listing

Personnel
Bee Gees
Barry Gibb – vocals, guitars, programming, drum programming, arranger, producer
Robin Gibb – vocals, arranger, producer
Maurice Gibb – vocals, keyboards, synthesizer, guitars, programming, drum programming, arranger, producer

Additional personnel

Claude "Swifty" Achille – engineer
Martyn Atkins – art direction, design
Reb Beach – electric guitar
Leland Sklar – bass
Tony Beard – drums
Andy Earl – photography
Sammy Figueroa – percussion
Ellen Fitton – engineer
Bob Gay – saxophone
Scott Glasel – programming, assistant engineer
Reggie Griffin – arranger, electric guitar, programming
Jeri Heiden – artwork
David A. Jones – 12-string bass
Robbie Kondor – keyboards, 12-string bass
Rhett Lawrence – synthesizer, keyboards, programming, drum programming
Will Lee – bass
Arif Mardin – arranger, electric guitar, producer, horn arrangements, string arrangements, synthesizer bass
Joe Mardin – programming, drum programming
George Marino – engineer
Marcus Miller – bass
Nick Moroch – electric guitar
Michael O'Reilly – engineer
Gene Orloff – concertmaster
Greg Phillinganes – synthesizer, keyboards, electric piano, programming
David Paich – keyboards
Ken Steiger – engineer
Brian Tench – producer, engineer, drum programming, mixing, percussion programming

Charts

Weekly charts

Year-end charts

Certifications and sales

References

1987 albums
Bee Gees albums
Warner Records albums
Albums arranged by Arif Mardin
Albums produced by Barry Gibb
Albums produced by Robin Gibb
Albums produced by Maurice Gibb
Albums produced by Arif Mardin
Dance-pop albums